Ludwig von Schröder (17 July 1854 Hintzenkamp near Eggesin – 23 July 1933 in Berlin-Halensee) was an Imperial German Navy officer and Admiral during the First World War and a recipient of the Pour le Mérite with Oak Leaves.

Schröder entered the newly organized Imperial Naval Service in May 1871 as cadet after passing his examinations. He was assigned for eight months to the sail training ship SMS Niobe before being posted to Naval School Kiel. After graduation he was initially assigned as subaltern to naval infantry, followed by service on several ships, then as commanding officer of the aviso SMS Blitz, the training vessel SMS Moltke and the cruiser SMS Vineta. With his promotion to admiral in January 1911 he functioned as chief of the Cruiser Division of the West Indies Station. In February 1912 Schröder was elevated to the hereditary Prussian nobility by Kaiser Wilhelm II. Admiral Ludwig von Schröder retired from active duty in 1913.  One of his final assignments was commander of Baltic Sea Naval Command.

With the outbreak of war in August 1914, Schröder was recalled to active service and named commanding Admiral in Flanders, placed in charge of both the seagoing forces and the 1st Marine Division. By mid-November 1914 additional naval infantry formations were raised and added to his command to form Marinekorps Flandern. He was in command during the 1916 Battle of Dover Strait, the successful German attack on the Dover Barrage. Schröder’s leadership earned him the sobriquet “Lion of Flanders” in Germany. 

After transfer to the Baltic near the end of the war, Schröder was ordered by Wilhelm II to take action against mutineering German sailors at Kiel. The government of Reichskanzler Max von Baden was opposed to these measures and the orders were thus not carried out. Ludwig von Schröder retired a second time on 12 December 1918. He died in Berlin-Halensee on 23 July 1933, age 79, and was buried at the Invalidenfriedhof cemetery, Berlin, with son Joachim (1885-1929) who preceded him in death. Son Ludwig Karl (1884-1941) was a Luftwaffe general during the Second World War.

Awards
 Albert Order
 Iron Cross 1st and 2rd Class
 Pour le Mérite (20 October 1915) with Oak Leaves (23 December 1917)
 Bavarian Military Merit Order
 Order of the Crown
 Order of the Red Eagle

Bibliography
 Karl-Friedrich Hildebrand, Christian Zweng: Die Ritter des Ordens Pour le Mérite des I. Weltkriegs, Band 3: P–Z, Biblio Verlag, Bissendorf 2011, S. 451-453
 
 Hanns Möller: Geschichte der Ritter des Ordens pour le mérite im Weltkrieg, Band II: M–Z, Verlag Bernard & Graefe, Berlin 1935, S. 442-444

References

External links
 
 

1854 births
1933 deaths
Imperial German Navy admirals of World War I
Recipients of the Pour le Mérite (military class)
Grand Crosses of the Military Merit Order (Bavaria)
Burials at the Invalids' Cemetery
People from Vorpommern-Greifswald
People from the Province of Pomerania
Admirals of the Imperial German Navy
Military personnel from Mecklenburg-Western Pomerania